Sandeep Shetty (born 23 July) is an Indian actor known for his roles in Tulu Cinemas like Dhand, Madime, Ekka Saka and many Dramas and stage performances. He, along with his team, Prashamsa won Bale Telipale, a stand-up comedy contest show on Namma TV for three consecutive years  in Coastal Karnataka. Sandeep has performed more than 1000 stage shows in international locations such as Muscat, Dubai, Kuwait and Bahrain, as well as locations within India including Bengaluru, Mumbai and Pune.

Early life
Sandeep Shetty was born on 23 July at Manibettu a place next to Shirva village of Udupi District. Sandeep, who holds BBM and MBA degrees, is the son of Sunder Shetty and Rathna Shetty. Sandeep started his acting career in 1998, writing and directing a Tulu drama titled 'Nathuna Paru'.

Filmography

Awards
 2015 - Bale Telipale Winner Prashamsa Team 
 2014 - Bale Telipale Winner Prashamsa Team
 2013 - Bale Telipale Winner Prashamsa Team
 'Kusalda Birse' - By Mumbai Kalabhimanigalu
 'Janamechida Hasya Nata' award in Puttur drama competition.

References

External links

Living people
Year of birth missing (living people)
Mangaloreans
Indian male film actors
Male actors in Tulu cinema
People from Udupi district
21st-century Indian male actors